Linus Klausenitzer is a German bass player, best known for being a former bassist for the German progressive death metal band Obscura. He also plays bass in a German/Dutch progressive death metal band Noneuclid, as well as progressive death metal project Alkaloid along with current and former members of both Obscura and Noneuclid.

Biography
At the age of 19, Klausenitzer attended the Music College in Regensburg, and afterwards made a degree at Hamburg Music and Art University. After finishing studies, he did a lot of session work in different genres, and in the meantime, was in a number of different German bands, Fall of Serenity being the most well-known one. He was also a member of Noneuclid, a German/Dutch progressive death metal band. He first joined Obscura as a touring bassist in 2011 and not shortly afterwards, Klausenitzer was announced as the band's new bassist. With them, he has recorded two albums - 2015's Akróasis and 2018's Diluvium.

In 2014 Klausenitzer takes part in the brand new band called "Alkaloid" (First album "The Malkuth Grimoire" came out in 2015)
As reported on his official website :
In contrast to his bass playing in Obscura and Noneuclid he uses a mix of fretless and fretted bass sounds across the whole album. To accomplish this it uses different sounds and basses: “Ibanez ATK”, a custom 7 string fretless “Ibanez BTB7″ and the hybrid bass “Ibanez Ashula”.In April 2020, Klausenitzer, as well as his bandmates Rafael Trujillo and Sebastian Lanser, left Obscura due to musical differences and founded a new band named Obsidious.

In 2021, Klausenitzer appeared as live bassist for the German metal band Beyond the Black and played also on their "ORIGINS - The Online Acoustic Experience" live-stream concert.

Equipment
Klausenitzer is endorsed by Ibanez basses and Ernie Ball strings. His main basses are:
 Custom Fretless BTB1896F Premium with Nordstrand Pickups – 6 string bass
 Custom Fretless Ibanez BTB7- 7 string bass
 Custom Fretless Ibanez BTB 676 - 6 string bass
 Ibanez EHB1005SMS Headless
 Ibanez Ashula – 1. generation – hybrid 6 string bass
 Ibanez Ashula – 2. generation – hybrid 7 string bass
 Ibanez BTB20TH5 – 5 string
 Ibanez ATK  - 5 string bass

About the amplifiers, Linus uses Ampeg.

Discography
 Obscura - Illegimitation (compilation) (2012)
 Hannes Grossmann - The Radial Covenant (2014)
 Noneuclid - Metatheosis (2014)
 Asurim - Deus-Ex Novus (2014, session)
 Christian Muenzner - Beyond the Wall of Sleep (2014)
 Alkaloid - The Malkuth Grimoire (2015)
 Obscura - Akróasis (2016)
 The Ritual Aura – Tæther (2016, guest on track 6)
 Eternity's End - The Fire Within (2016)
 Hannes Grossmann - The Crypts of Sleep (2016)
 Fountainhead - Reverse Engineering (2016)
 Ilusen's Fallacy - The Ilusen's Fallacy (2016)
 Alkaloid - Liquid Anatomy (2018)
 Obscura - Diluvium (2018)
 Enblood - Cast To Exile (2018, guest on track 2)
 Kaoteon - Damnatio Memoriae (2018, session)
 Nepřítel - II (2019, session)
 Hannes Grossmann - Apophenia (2019)
 Death Tribe - Beyond Pain and Pleasure: A Desert Experiment (2019, session)
 Shaped In Dreams - Echoes of Eldren Deeds (2019, session)
 Hasan Iqbal - Of the Sky (2020, session)
 Christian Muenzner - Path Of The Hero (2020)
 Kaoteon - Kaoteon (2018, session)
 Hannes Grossmann - To Where The Light Retreats (2021)
 Vriess - Vriess (2021, session)
 Death Tribe - Beyond the Red Light District: A Canal Experiment (2021, session)
 Eternity's End - Embers of War (2021)
 Infitinite Shapes - Singles (2020-2022, session)

References

External links
 Linus-Klausenitzer.com
 Alkaloid - Gear Rundown - Linus Klausenitzer
 Alkaloid (youtube) - Introducing Linus Klausenitzer
 Alkaloid (youtube) - From A Hadron Machinist (Bass Playthrough) 

German bass guitarists
Male bass guitarists
Living people
Obscura (band) members
Year of birth missing (living people)
German male guitarists